Out of Ashes is the only studio album by American rock band Dead by Sunrise, which consisted of Linkin Park lead vocalist Chester Bennington and Amir Derakh, Ryan Shuck, Anthony 'Fu' Valcic, Brandon Belsky, and Elias Andra of Julien-K. It was released on October 13, 2009 through Warner Bros. Records, to mixed to positive reception. The album was produced by Howard Benson. The album charted on the Billboard 200, peaking at No. 29. The album spawned three singles, "Crawl Back In", "Fire", and "Let Down". The album achieved moderate success in the US charts.

The album's lyrical contains many personal experiences by Bennington in the previous years before the album's production. It was described as "really dark" and "much more of a rock album" than the works of Linkin Park.

History 
The first known song from Out of Ashes is "Morning After", an iTunes edition bonus track. "Morning After" was originally a solo song by Bennington, whilst a remix by Julien K appeared on the soundtrack of Underworld: Evolution.

Out of Ashes was originally slated for a 2006 release, when the group was still known as Snow White Tan. It was soon pushed to an early 2007 release, but due to his commitments to Linkin Park, Bennington held the record off indefinitely. The Pulse of Radio posted that Bennington's solo album was still in production and would be finalized in the spring of 2008. At this point, Bennington described in an interview with Rolling Stone that he hoped to see the album released in 2009, placing his full commitment to the album. The band made its debut in 2008 at Marquee Theatre at Tempe, Arizona. He also said in some interviews that he would be working on the record while simultaneously writing Linkin Park's then-unreleased fourth studio album, and that the songs on the album developed during that process.

Style and composition
On the album's style Bennington said it "felt and sounded really good", but "they weren't right stylistically for Linkin Park" and described the songs as "darker and moodier" than the sounds of Linkin Park. Linkin Park co-lead vocalist Mike Shinoda stated that, compared to Linkin Park's work, is "much more of a rock album" Bennington also described the album in an interview with MTV that "It's really dark. It's like post-apocalyptic Blade Runner meets LSD". He also stated that all the songs were based on personal experiences. In the same interview, Bennington said, 

As well as singing, Bennington also performs guitar and synthesizer on the album. All extra instrumental, programming and production was undertaken by Julien-K members Amir Derakh, Ryan Shuck, Brandon Belsky, Elias Andra, and Anthony "Fu" Valcic.

Release and promotion 
In the summer of 2009, the official name and release date for the album was announced. Dead by Sunrise went out on tour with Linkin Park during August, promoting Out of Ashes by playing three songs ("Fire, "Crawl Back In", "My Suffering") every show during Linkin Park's first encore break. The first single from the album, "Crawl Back In", was released for download on August 18, with an accompanying music video released on September 8. The entire album was uploaded to the band's official MySpace profile on October 9, just four days before the official release. The album did considerably well in the charts, and reached No. 29 on the Billboard 200.

On October 13, 2009, the same day as the album's release, Dead by Sunrise made their first television appearance on the Late Show with David Letterman. The band also performed on October 21, 2009 on Jimmy Kimmel Live!. After its release, Dead by Sunrise proceeded to tour throughout the United States, Europe, and Asia promoting the album.

On November 24, the second official single, "Let Down" was released, along with an accompanying music video. In an article from Sputnik Music, "Let Down" was described as "despite the synth atmosphere that turned out to be strange, it has a chorus that becomes difficult to get out of your head, as the harmonies to the song became impressively successful." In another article from Ultimate Guitar Archive, the song has been carefully explained as "quite an electronic and bass guitar type of song, even at the beginning of 'Let Down', and is another mellow song that makes Chester Bennington show off his soft vocals again, as the chorus becomes very good." A music video was filmed for "Let Down", along with a video for "Crawl Back In". Both videos were directed by P. R. Brown. The video was premiered on December 4, 2009 via YouTube.

Despite reports that "Inside of Me" and "Too Late" were going to be the next two singles, they never saw official releases, although "Inside of Me" was included as a b-side to the digital single of "Let Down".

"Condemned" was included in the soundtrack of Saw 3D (in which Bennington starred as a skinhead), which was released on October 26, 2010.

Critical reception

Out of Ashes received mixed to positive reviews among music critics. At Metacritic, which assigns a weighted average score out of 100 to reviews from mainstream critics, the album received an average score of 59 based on 5 reviews, indicating "mixed or average reviews".

Gregory Heaney of AllMusic gave a favorable review of the album, saying that "As a whole, Out of Ashes is a solid record and a fine opening volley for Bennington's solo work." Gary Graff of Billboard described Out of Ashes as "grittier and more punk-driven" than the works of Linkin Park. Faye Lewis of Rock Sound said that it "throws down anguished alt-rock and enough crunching guitars and intense lyrics to frighten off Linkin Park comparisons."

Jody Rosen of Rolling Stone noted that the album is "oddly inert, lacking both the brute force and big choruses that raised Linkin Park to rap-rock godhead status." August Brown of The Los Angeles Times commenting that "Out of Ashes has moments of spark, it's more scattershot and less ambitious than the music Bennington makes with Linkin Park." Jon Pareles of The New York Times called Out of Ashes "spacious, state of the art pop", but at the same time "shamelessly imitative", citing similarities to Nirvana, Pink Floyd, Green Day and Metallica. Classic Rock reviewer dismissed the album as "yet more brooding alt metal, ... a bit too ponderous at times" and "boasting the kind of lyrics that any troubled teen will identify with", when "a more pacey approach would have paid off big time".

Track listing

Personnel
Dead by Sunrise
 Chester Bennington – vocals, guitar, synthesizer
 Amir Derakh – lead guitar, rhythm guitar, synthesizer, programming, bass guitar
 Ryan Shuck – guitar, synthesizer, beatbox vocals (track 12)
 Anthony 'Fu' Valcic – programming, synthesizer
 Brandon Belsky – bass guitar, additional synthesizer, additional programming
 Elias Andra – drums

Production
 Howard Benson – producer
 Mike Plotnikoff - recording
 Hatsukazu "Hatch" Inagaki - engineer
 Andrew Schubert - assistant engineer
 Brad Townsend - assistant engineer
 Keith Armstrong - assistant engineer
 Nik Karpen - assistant engineer
Chris Lord-Alge - mixing
Ted Jensen - mastering at Sterling Sound in NYC, NY

Charts

References

2009 debut albums
Albums produced by Howard Benson
Dead by Sunrise albums
Warner Records albums